Dinonylnaphthylsulfonic acid (DINNSA) is an organic chemical, an aryl sulfonic acid.  Its melting point is 259.5 °C and its boiling point is 600.4 °C. It has very low water solubility. It is a moderate skin irritant and a strong eye irritant. It has low volatility and vapor pressure and is stable above 100 °C.

Dinonylnaphthylsulfonic acid is used as an additive in industrial lubricants, greases, cutting fluids, industrial coatings, and corrosion inhibitors.

Dinonylnaphthylsulfonic acid is a component of Stadis 450 which is an antistatic agent added to distillate fuels, solvents, commercial jet fuels, and to the military JP-8 fuel to increase the electrical conductivity of the fluid. Fluids with increased conductivity more readily dissipate static charges  to mitigate the risk of explosions or fires due to Static Discharge Ignitions

Dinonylnaphthylsulfonic acid by itself does not function as an anti-static additive.

Dinonylnaphthylsulfonic acid is prepared by reaction of naphthalene with nonene, yielding diisononylnaphthalene. Diisononylnaphthalene then undergoes sulfonation.

External links
 EPA: Dinonylnaphthalene category

Sulfonic acids
Antistatic agents
Fuel additives